Vikafestivalen was a Norwegian pop and rock festival situated at Mo i Rana in northern Norway. It has succeeded Sjonstock, a festival arranged in the outskirts of Mo I Rana every year for 10 years (1995-2005) until it was moved closer to the city and renamed Vikafestivalen (2006). In December 2008 the festival board announced that the festival was cancelled.

History
The Sjonstock festival started out as a birthday celebration in Sjona outside the city of Mo i Rana, but fast became immensely popular amongst local youths. Soon enough they attracted big national performers, and grew steadily each year.

Key performers
2007: Lauryn Hill, Sivert Høyem, Europe, BigBang, Satyricon, Karpe Diem

2006: Motörhead, Dum Dum Boys, Turbonegro, Håkan Hellström, Marit Larsen, Minor Majority, Mew

Sjonstock:

2005:We, Madrugada, TNT

2004:BigBang, Sondre Lerche, Side Brok

2003: Dum Dum Boys, Gothminister, Bertine Zetlitz, Thomas Dybdahl, John Doe, Gatas Parlament

2002:Björn Rosenström, Tungtvann, Surferosa

2001:Cadillac, Bel Canto

2000:Madrugada, BigBang

1999:Locomotives, Astroburger, Zuma

1998:Hollow, Oddpopp

1997:Fru Pedersen

1996:Jokers Grind, Suckers Market

1995:White Wings

External links
Official site (mostly in Norwegian)
Official Site: English (Limited pages)

Culture in Nordland
Music festivals in Norway
Rana, Norway